Crematogaster cicatriculosa is a species of ant in tribe Crematogastrini. It was described by Roger in 1863.

References

cicatriculosa
Insects described in 1863